Love's Lariat is a 1916 American silent film featuring Harry Carey.

Plot
A cowboy called Sky High learns that he has inherited a fortune, but must move to the East to collect and keep it. The only other heir, Landers, conspires with gold-digger Goldie Le Croix to seduce and abandon Sky High, sharing his newfound wealth. The plot fails when Goldie genuinely falls for him.

Cast
 Harry Carey as Sky High
 Neal Hart as Skeeter
 William Quinn as Allan Landers
 Olive Carey as Goldie Le Croix (as Olive Fuller Golden)
 Pedro León as Cowboy
 Joe Rickson as Cowboy
 Tom Grimes as Cowboy (as Tommy Grimes)
 William Gillis as Cowboy (as Bill Gillis)
 Bud Osborne as Cowboy

See also
 Harry Carey filmography

References

External links
 

1916 films
American black-and-white films
1916 Western (genre) films
1916 short films
Films directed by George Marshall
Films directed by Harry Carey
Universal Pictures films
Silent American Western (genre) films
1910s American films